Styelidae is a family of ascidian tunicates.

Genera
Alloeocarpa Michaelsen, 1900
Arnbackia Brewin, 1950
Asterocarpa Brewin, 1946
Bathyoncus Herdman, 1882
Bathystyeloides Seeliger, 1907
Berillia Brewin, 1952
Botryllocarpa Hartmeyer, 1909
Botrylloides Milne-Edwards, 1841
Botryllus Gaertner, 1774
Chorizocarpa Michaelsen, 1904
 Chorizocormus Herdman, 1886
Cnemidocarpa Huntsman, 1913
Dendrodoa MacLeay, 1824
Dextrocarpa Millar, 1955
Diandrocarpa Van Name, 1902
Dicarpa Millar, 1955
Distomus Gaertner, 1774
Eusynstyela Michaelsen, 1904
Gynandrocarpa Michaelsen, 1900
Kukenthalia Hartmeyer, 1903
Metandrocarpa Michaelsen, 1904
Monandrocarpa Michaelsen, 1904
Oculinaria Gray, 1868
Oligocarpa Hartmeyer, 1911
Pelonaia Forbes & Goodsir, 1841
Podostyela
Polyandrocarpa Michaelsen, 1904
Polycarpa Heller, 1877
Polyzoa Lesson, 1831
Protostyela Millar, 1954
Psammostyela Weinstein, 1961
Seriocarpa Diehl, 1969
Stolonica Lacaze-Duthiers & Délage, 1892
Styela Fleming, 1822
Symplegma Herdman, 1886
Syncarpa Redikorzev, 1913
Theodorella Michaelsen, 1922
Tibitin Monniot, 1983

Nomina nuda
Styeloides Sluiter, 1895
Synstyela Giard, 1874

References

Stolidobranchia
Tunicate families
Taxa named by William Abbott Herdman